Queen Esther is an American actor, musician, and songwriter.

A member of guitarist James Blood Ulmer's Black Rock Experience and a jazz vocalist, she cultivates a sound that she describes as Black Americana. Queen Esther was the 2008 Grand Prize winner of the Jazzmobile Jazz Vocal Competition, and a 2013 regional finalist  and a 2014 finalist  and in the Mountain Stage NewSong Contest.

Early life
Steeped in the gospel music traditions of the Church of God in Christ (C.O.G.I.C.) from a very early age while surrounded by a soundscape of freeform radio, countrypolitan music and show tunes, Queen Esther grew up in Atlanta, Georgia, and Charleston, South Carolina, as the middle child and the only daughter, with six brothers and a four-octave range.

While attending Northside High School, a magnet school in the performing arts (now North Atlanta High School) in Atlanta, she studied opera and classical music, developed an appreciation of jazz, was featured in productions in the city (Leonard Bernstein's MASS with the Atlanta Symphony Orchestra), attended the Georgia Governor’s Honors Program in Drama, and competed for and won several scholarships in theater through Arts Recognition and Talent Search (now YoungArts), sponsored by the National Foundation for Advancement in the Arts. Queen Esther attended University of Texas and performed frequently on the local cabaret and theater scene in Austin with  director Boyd Vance. She also performed with the band Moving Parts, opening for guitarist Larry Carlton, the Neville Brothers and Crowded House. She was in Ro-Tel and the Hot Tomatoes, a regional favorite specializing in theatrically showcasing girl group music from the 1950s and '60s.

Career
Guitarist Al Gilhausen introduced her to blues musician Hubert Sumlin. She lost herself in the blues and found her way back to her gospel and country roots.

After forming the avant-blues duo Hoosegow with Elliott Sharp and releasing the critically acclaimed album Mighty (Homestead), While on tour, she started her label EL Recordings and continued to develop her ideas regardless of genre.

Actor
In 2002, Queen Esther received a Best Actress AUDELCO award nomination for her work in George C. Wolfe's musical Harlem Song. A member of AEA and SAG-AFTRA, she has toured in theatrical productions regionally, nationally, and internationally, performing in workshops, festivals, cabarets, plays, musicals, and Off-Broadway shows.

In the aftermath of the 9/11 disaster, Queen Esther hosted and performed in The Tribeca Playhouse Stagedoor Canteen, a weekly hour-long USO-style variety show created and directed by playwright and theater director Jeff Cohen that welcomed performers to entertain Ground Zero relief workers for free. Produced by Cohen and Carol Fineman, the show was featured on NY1, The Today Show, CBS Morning News, The Metro Channel, and Good Morning America, and in Variety and The New York Times.

Musician

A vocalist, songwriter, lyricist and guitarist, Queen Esther signed a publishing deal with Bug Music in 2004  (now owned by BMG Rights Management) and independently released her album Talkin' Fishbowl Blues. Of this effort, AllMusic wrote, "There's a decidedly Stonesy swagger to many of these tunes with just a touch of twang, and Queen Esther shows herself to be just as versatile a vocalist as Tina Turner, covering not only the lead vocals but nearly all the background vocals as well."

In 2014, Queen Esther produced and self-released her second Black Americana album The Other Side. Featuring guitarists Marvin Sewell and Ronny Drayton as well as pedal steel guitarist Bob Hoffnar and violinist Charles Burnham, it was described by writer Geoffrey Himes as "the most exciting Afro-Americana release of the year."

Queen Esther is a member of guitarist James Blood Ulmer's Black Rock Experience  with G. Calvin Weston (drums) and Mark Peterson (bass) and has toured Europe with Ulmer, including his group Odyssey.

In 2014, J. C. Hopkins Biggish Band featuring Queen Esther and jazz vocalist Charles Turner began its residency at Minton's Harlem. Jazz critic Will Friedwald wrote, "The combination of pianist-bandleader J. C. Hopkins and vocalist Queen Esther expertly recapture the vitality and energy of Harlem jazz and blues of 70 years ago without slavishly imitating anyone and are thus a perfect fit, and they should help the relaunched room attract the attention of dancers as well as diners."

Queen Esther performs with her quintet The Hot Five, which plays arrangements of American standards and original material. Performances include The Kennedy Center, The Apollo Theater's Apollo Music Cafe, New Year's Eve Eve, an annual event produced by The Salon, and the bi-annual Jazz Age Lawn Party, presented by Michael Arenella and his Dreamland Orchestra.

Writer
While in college and in New York City, Queen Esther worked as a freelance writer and essayist, most notably for The Griot, New York Press, and Cafe Los Negroes.

It was after seeing John Leguizamo’s Mambo Mouth at the American Place Theater that Queen Esther wrote, developed and performed The "Moxie" Show, a one person performance art piece that was subsequently featured at Dixon Place, Performance Space 122 and The Samuel Beckett Theater.

Queen Esther wrote, developed and performed her second one person show, the semi-autobiographical Queen Esther: Unemployed Superstar, at Tribeca Playhouse, The New York International Fringe Festival, The Diva Series at George Street Playhouse and the New Work Now! New Performance Now! series at The Public Theater, culminating in a five-week sold-out run at Joe's Pub.

Adapted from newly discovered Harlem-based short stories by Zora Neale Hurston and augmented by Billie Holiday's rare sides – both from the 1930s – Queen Esther wrote the libretto for The Billie Holiday Project, performing it initially at Lenox Lounge for the Harlem Jazz Shrines and developing it further in performance workshops with Dixon Place and The Field. Featuring The Hot Five with a cast that included Francesca Harper, Charles L. Wallace and Keith L. Thomas, the show was performed at The Apollo Theater's Apollo Music Cafe in April, 2012.

Queen Esther partnered with The Francesca Harper Project to further explore Billie Holiday's body of work through movement, sound and vision in Billie Holiday: Deconstructed, a theatrical performance that premiered at the Harlem Arts Festival in June, 2012.

Discography

Solo
 Talkin' Fishbowl Blues (EL Recordings, 2004)
 What is Love? (EL Recordings, 2010)
 The Other Side (EL Recordings, 2014)

As member or guest
With Hoosegow
 Mighty (Homestead, 1996) with Elliott Sharp

With James Blood Ulmer
 No Escape from the Blues: The Electric Lady Sessions (Hyena, 2003)

With 52nd Street Blues Project
 Blues & Grass (Chesky, 2004)

With J. C. Hopkins Biggish Band
 Underneath a Brooklyn Moon (Tigerlily, 2005)

With The Harlem Experiment
 The Harlem Experiment (Ropeadope, 2007)

With Elliott Sharp and Henry Kaiser
 Electric Willie: A Tribute to Willie Dixon (Yellowbird [Germany], 2010)

References

External links
 Official website
 Queen Esther at NPR Music
 
 http://www.earcandymag.com/queenesther-2005.htm Ear Candy magazine
 https://www.npr.org/2005/10/22/4968671/under-a-brooklyn-moon-new-jazz-ballads Underneath a Brooklyn Moon: New Jazz Ballads

American jazz singers
American women jazz singers
Living people
Musicians from Atlanta
University of Texas at Austin alumni
The New School alumni
Year of birth missing (living people)
Jazz musicians from New York (state)
21st-century American women singers
21st-century American singers